Expecting to Fly may refer to: 
"Expecting to Fly" (song), a song by Buffalo Springfield
Expecting to Fly (album), an album by The Bluetones
Expecting to Fly (Book), a book by Patrick Sheridan
"Expecting to Fly", a song by the New Zealand band Headless Chickens, off their 1988 album Stunt Clown